Up and Away is a 2018 Danish animated fantasy adventure film written and directed by Karsten Kiilerich, based on the children's book of the same name by Danish writer Ole Lund Kirkegaard.

Premise 
Young boy Hodja lives in the small town of Pjort, but dreams of traveling the world. So – against his father's wishes – Hodja makes a deal with his neighbour that lets him borrow his flying carpet on the condition that Hodja will try to find the man's granddaughter, Diamond.

Cast 
Thure Lindhardt as Hodja
Özlem Saglanmak as Smaragd
Peter Zhelder as Rotten
Kurt Ravn as El Faza
Peter Frödin as Sultan
Raaberg as Mor Birgitte
Lars Ranthe as Far
Rebecca Rønde Kiilerich as Perlesten
Jens Jacob Tychsen as Grumme
Troells Toya as Salep
Erik Holmey and Michael Zuckow Mardorf as Vagt
Vibeke Duehol as the Sultan's favourite wife

Release 
The film was released in Denmark on 2 February 2018, where it received 164,273 admissions in Danish cinemas. It grossed $1,230,407 worldwide.

References

External links 

Up and Away at the Danish Film Institute

2018 computer-animated films
Danish animated fantasy films
2010s fantasy adventure films
2010s Danish-language films
Films directed by Karsten Kiilerich